The Roman Catholic Archdiocese of Campo Grande is a Latin Church ecclesiastical territory or archdiocese of the Catholic Church located in the city of Campo Grande, Brazil. It is a metropolitan see and has six suffragans in its ecclesiastical province: Corumbá, Coxim, Dourados, Jardim, Naviraí, and Três Lagoas.

History
 15 June 1957: Established as Diocese of Campo Grande from the Diocese of Corumbá and Territorial Prelature of Registro do Araguaia
 27 November 1978: Promoted as  Archdiocese of Campo Grande

Bishops

Ordinaries, in reverse chronological order
 Archbishops of Campo Grande 
 Archbishop Dimas Lara Barbosa (2011.05.04 - present)
 Archbishop Vitório Pavanello, S.D.B. (1986.12.12 – 2011.05.04)
 Archbishop Antônio Barbosa, S.D.B. (1978.11.27 – 1986.12.12)
 Bishops of Campo Grande 
 Bishop Antônio Barbosa, S.D.B. (later Archbishop) (1958.01.23 – 1978.11.27)

Coadjutor archbishop
Vitório Pavanello, S.D.B. (1984-1986)

Auxiliary bishops
Eduardo Pinheiro da Silva, S.D.B. (2005-2015), appointed Bishop of Jaboticabal, São Paulo
Janusz Marian Danecki, O.F.M. Conv. (2015-

Sources
 GCatholic.org
 Catholic Hierarchy
 Archdiocese website

Roman Catholic dioceses in Brazil
Roman Catholic ecclesiastical provinces in Brazil
 
Christian organizations established in 1957
Roman Catholic dioceses and prelatures established in the 20th century